The Flapper is a 1920 American silent comedy film starring Olive Thomas. Directed by Alan Crosland, the film was the first in the United States to portray the "flapper" lifestyle, which became a cultural craze or fad in the 1920s.

Plot
Sixteen-year-old Genevieve 'Ginger' King (Thomas) is living in a very wealthy family in the boring town of Orange Springs, Florida with her younger siblings, where her unchaperoned decision to drink a soda with a young male is considered scandalous. Because of her questionable behavior and yearning for a more excitable life, Ginger's father decides to send her to a boarding school in Lake Placid, New York. Mrs. Paddles' School for Young Ladies is administered by the strict disciplinarian, Mrs. Paddles (Marcia Harris).

Despite the strictness there, the girls have fun getting into flapper-lifestyle trouble including flirting. Richard Channing (William P. Carleton), an older man, rides past the seminary every day, prompting romantic fantasies among the schoolgirls. When Ginger connives a sleigh ride with Channing, she lies to him about her age, saying she is "about twenty". Ginger is quickly charmed and becomes enamored with him. Ginger soon gets into trouble with the headmistress by sneaking out to the local country club where Channing is having a party. One of her schoolmates, Hortense (Katherine Johnston), who is described as “a moth among the butterflies”, informs on her. Hortense’s actual motive for doing this is to get the headmistress out of the way so she can rob the school's safe and flee with her crooked boyfriend Thomas Morran (Arthur Housman). Acting on a vaguely worded note she receives, Ginger—while traveling home from school—goes to a hotel in New York City where Hortense and Thomas are staying. They force her to take some suitcases for safekeeping, cases that contain stolen valuables, including fancy clothes and jewelry.

Knowing that Channing has gone to Orange Springs on a yachting trip, Ginger decides to use the clothes and jewels to present herself as a more-mature, well-dressed “woman of experience” when she returns home. Her plan backfires, and her father believes she is lying when she says it is all a joke. Detectives then show up wanting to know why she has stolen loot; and both her young admirer Bill and Channing think she has really become a wicked woman. Hortense and her crooked boyfriend now turn up in Orange Springs to reclaim their ill-gotten loot. Their subsequent capture by the police clears Ginger's name and restores her reputation.

The events in the lives of Ginger King and another character are presented as incidents in a (non-fiction) newsreel at the end of the movie.

Cast
 Olive Thomas as Ginger King
 Warren Cook as Senator King
 Theodore Westman, Jr. as Bill Forbes
 Katherine Johnston as Hortense
 Arthur Housman as Tom Morran
 Louise Lindroth as Elmina Buttons
 Charles Craig as Reverend Cushil
 William P. Carleton as Richard Channing
 Marcia Harris as Mrs. Paddles
 Bobby Connelly as King, Jr.
 Athole Shearer as Extra (uncredited)
 Norma Shearer as Schoolgirl (uncredited)

Production notes
 Frances Marion wrote the screenplay, which is credited with popularizing the slang term “flapper” throughout the United States in the 1920s.
 Olive Thomas appeared in only two films after The Flapper. She died in Paris in September 1920.

Reception
The Film Daily gave it an overall positive review on May 23, 1920, praising the acting of Olive Thomas. Its main criticism was regarding the editing and the conclusion of the film, writing that the story was "cleverly written with many amusing situations, but latter reels should be compressed".

Public domain and home-media release
The Flapper, originally a “six-reeler”, is no longer under copyright. Now in the public domain, the film is free for general, unrestricted use.
In 2005, The Flapper was released on Region 1 DVD by the Milestone Collection as part of The Olive Thomas Collection.

References and notes

External links

Variety 1920 Review

1920 comedy films
1920 films
1920s American films
American black-and-white films
Silent American comedy films
American silent feature films
Articles containing video clips
Films directed by Alan Crosland
Films set in Florida
Films set in New York City
Films shot in New York City
Films with screenplays by Frances Marion
Selznick Pictures films
Surviving American silent films
Flappers